Bosnia became part of the Ottoman Empire after 1454. The Ottoman government appointed sanjak-beys as governors of Bosnia. The following is a list of Ottoman governors of the Bosnian sanjak, eyalet, and vilayet within Ottoman Empire.

References

Sources

Bosnia
 
Ottoman governors
Bosnia, Ottoman
Bosnia